CIHS-FM is a Canadian radio station broadcasting a gospel music format at 93.5 FM in Wetaskiwin, Alberta and is owned by Tag Broadcasting.

The station began broadcasting in the early 2000s after being given approval by the Canadian Radio-television and Telecommunications Commission (CRTC) on November 8, 2000. The station has also gone through some technical changes.

References

External links
CIHS 93.5 FM
 
 

Ihs
Ihs
Radio stations established in 2001
Wetaskiwin
2001 establishments in Alberta